"The Essential" is a budget greatest hits album by Australian rock musician Diesel. The album was released in February 2009. It includes tracks from Diesel's first two albums; Johnny Diesel and The Injectors (1989) and Hepfidelity (1992).

Track listing
CD/DD (2430722)
 "Cry in Shame" – 4:46
 "Parisienne Hotel" – 4:04
 "Come to Me"  (UK Remix)  – 4:23
 "Tip of My Tongue" – 4:12
 "Don't Need Love" – 4:13
 "Man Alive" – 4:51
 "Since I Fell for You" – 5:38
 "One More Time" – 4:03
 "Please Send Me Someone to Love" – 4:23
 "Lookin' for Love" – 3:30
 "Love Junk" – 3:46
 "Soul Revival" – 4:05

External links

References

Diesel (musician) albums
2009 compilation albums
EMI Records albums
Compilation albums by Australian artists